Here are lists of movies with more than one Academy Award nomination in the same category.  The movie, year and nominees will be listed, as well as the outcome at the ceremony.

Academy Award for Best Actor

Academy Award for Best Actress

Academy Award for Best Supporting Actor

Academy Award for Best Supporting Actress

Academy Award for Best Original Song

See also 
List of films with two or more Academy Awards in an acting category

References

Movies with more than one Academy Award nomination in the same category
Academy Award